is an interchange passenger railway station located in the city of Hachiōji, Tokyo, jointly operated by East Japan Railway Company (JR East) and the private railway operator Keio Corporation.

Lines
Takao Station is served by the JR Chūō Main Line and is the last major station in Tokyo for the westbound Chūō Main Line. Therefore, it is a terminating station for many local and rapid trains on the line. The station is 53.1 kilometers from Tokyo Station. It is also a terminus for Narita Express trains travelling on the line.

Station layout
The JR East station has two island platforms serving four tracks. The station has a Midori no Madoguchi staffed ticket office.

JR East platforms

Keio platforms

The Keio Takao Line is served by a single elevated island platform, serving two tracks.

History
The JR East station opened on 1 August 1901. The Keio station opened on 1 October 1967. With the privatization of Japanese National Railways (JNR) on 1 April 1987, the station came under the control of JR East.

Passenger statistics
In fiscal 2019, the JR station was used by an average of 28,214 passengers daily (boarding passengers only). In the same year, the Keio station was used by an average of 26,683 passengers daily. 

The passenger figures (boarding passengers only) for previous years are as shown below.

See also
 List of railway stations in Japan

References

External links

 Takao station information (JR East) 
 Takao station information (Keio) 

Stations of Keio Corporation
Hachiōji, Tokyo
Stations of East Japan Railway Company
Railway stations in Tokyo
Railway stations in Japan opened in 1901
Chūō Main Line